is a railway station on the Tokyu Meguro Line in Shinagawa, Tokyo, Japan, operated by the private railway operator Tokyu Corporation.

Lines
Fudō-mae Station is served by the Tokyu Meguro Line. Only "Local" all-stations trains stop at this station.

Station layout
This station consists of two opposed side platforms serving two tracks. Only local trains stop at this station.

History
The station opened on March 11, 1923 as  when the Meguro Kamata Railway started its operation between Meguro Station and Maruko Station (present-day Numabe Station). The station was renamed Fudō-mae in October 1923.

Ridership

See also
 List of railway stations in Japan

References

External links

 Fudō-mae Station information  (Tokyu Corporation) 

Railway stations in Tokyo
Tokyu Meguro Line
Railway stations in Japan opened in 1923